Mentougou District is a district in western Beijing. Spanning , with 266,591 inhabitants (2000 Census), it is subdivided into 4 subdistricts of the city proper of Beijing and 9 towns (1 of which is a suburb of the city proper of Beijing). It borders the Beijing districts of Changping to the northeast, Haidian and Shijingshan to the east, Fengtai to the southeast, and Fangshan to the south, as well as Hebei province to the west and northwest.

It lies in the Western Hills of Beijing and is mountainous in terrain. In fact, the mountainous terrain—including a hundred or more peaks—occupy a stunning 93% of the entire area.

  The 6th Ring Road cuts through the eastern, more urbanised section of Mentougou Precinct.

Tourism
Mentougou is gaining popularity as a tourist destination. Among its main sights are Jietai Temple, Tanzhe Temple, Longmen Gully (or Canyon), Mount Baihua, Mount Ling (the highest mountain in Beijing at 2,303 metres), Mount Miaofeng, and the village of Cuandixia.

Transport

Metro 
Mentougou District is served by one line of the Beijing Subway

Administrative divisions
There are 4 subdistricts and 6 towns with 3 towns of which carry the "area" label:

Education

Climate 

Mentougou District has a humid continental climate (Köppen climate classification Dwa).

See also

Cuandixia

References

 
Districts of Beijing